The 2020 Unhinged 300 was a NASCAR Xfinity Series race held on June 20, 2020 at Talladega Superspeedway in Lincoln, Alabama. Contested over 113 laps on the  superspeedway, it was the 11th race of the 2020 NASCAR Xfinity Series season and the season's third Dash 4 Cash race. Kaulig Racing's Justin Haley picked up his first career Xfinity Series victory.

The race was originally scheduled to be held on April 25, but was rescheduled due to the COVID-19 pandemic.

Report

Background 

Talladega Superspeedway, formerly known as Alabama International Motor Speedway, is a motorsports complex located north of Talladega, Alabama. It is located on the former Anniston Air Force Base in the small city of Lincoln. A tri-oval, the track was constructed in 1969 by the International Speedway Corporation, a business controlled by the France family. Talladega is most known for its steep banking. The track currently hosts NASCAR's Cup Series, Xfinity Series and Gander RV & Outdoors Truck Series. Talladega is the longest NASCAR oval with a length of 2.66-mile-long (4.28 km) tri-oval like the Daytona International Speedway, which is 2.5-mile-long (4.0 km).

Because of the ongoing COVID-19 pandemic, the race was held with limited spectators, with the grandstands and infield closed.  Spectators were restricted to the 44 open backstretch motorhome lots who had camping tickets for both days of the meeting.

Dash 4 Cash 
The Dash 4 Cash is a series of four races in the NASCAR Xfinity Series, preceded by a qualifying race. The top four points-eligible drivers in the previous race are eligible to win a $100,000 bonus on top of their race winnings if they win the race. Cup Series regulars are not permitted to compete in the races.

The Unhinged 300 was the season's third Dash 4 Cash race. A. J. Allmendinger, Chase Briscoe, Ross Chastain, and Brandon Jones were eligible to win after finishing in the top 4 at the Contender Boats 250 at Homestead.

Entry list 

 (R) denotes rookie driver.
 (i) denotes driver who is ineligible for series driver points.

Qualifying 
Justin Haley was awarded the pole for the race as determined by a random draw.

Starting Lineup 

 . – Eligible for Dash 4 Cash prize money.

 The No. 8 and No. 16 had to start from the rear due to failing pre-race inspection.
 The No. 47 had to start from the rear due to a driver change.
 The No. 99 had to start from the rear due to an unapproved adjustment.

Race

Race results

Stage Results 
Stage One

Laps: 25

Stage Two

Laps: 25

Final Stage Results 
Laps: 63

 . – Won the Dash 4 Cash prize money and subsequently qualified for the Dash 4 Cash prize money in the next race.
 . – Qualified for Dash 4 Cash prize money in the next race.

Race statistics 

 Lead changes: 22 among 12 different drivers
 Cautions/Laps: 6 for 22
 Red flags: 2
 Time of race: 2 hours, 15 minutes, 52 seconds
 Average speed:

Media

Television 
The Unhinged 300 was carried by FS1 in the United States. Adam Alexander, Stewart-Haas Racing driver Aric Almirola, and Jamie McMurray called the race from the Fox Sports Studio in Charlotte, with Jamie Little and Vince Welch covering pit road.

Radio 
The Motor Racing Network (MRN) called the race for radio, which was simulcast on SiriusXM NASCAR Radio.

Standings after the race 

 Drivers' Championship standings

 Note: Only the first 12 positions are included for the driver standings.
 . – Driver has clinched a position in the NASCAR playoffs.

References 

2020 NASCAR Xfinity Series
Unhinged 300
2020 in sports in Alabama
NASCAR races at Talladega Superspeedway
Unhinged 300